Paul Richard Furay (born May 9, 1944) is an American singer, guitarist, songwriter, and Rock & Roll Hall of Fame member (with Buffalo Springfield). He is best known for forming the bands Buffalo Springfield with Stephen Stills, Neil Young, Bruce Palmer, and Dewey Martin, and Poco with Jim Messina, Timothy B. Schmit, Rusty Young, George Grantham and Randy Meisner. His best known song (originally written during his tenure in Buffalo Springfield, but eventually performed by Poco as well) was "Kind Woman," which he wrote for his wife, Nancy.

Life and career

Early career 

Before Buffalo Springfield, Furay performed with Stills in the nine-member group, the Au Go Go Singers (Furay, Roy Michaels, Rick Geiger, Jean Gurney, Michael Scott, Kathy King, Nels Gustafson, Bob Harmelink, and Stills), the house band of the famous Cafe Au Go Go in New York City.

In the late 1960s, he formed the country rock band Poco with Jim Messina (who produced albums and occasionally played bass for Buffalo Springfield) and Rusty Young. This band, while influential to many future country rock acts, experienced uneven commercial success. Furay's best-known songs, "Kind Woman", "Pickin' Up The Pieces", and "Good Feelin' To Know", however, have reached classic status and appear on many country rock compilations.

Furay left Poco in 1974 to form the Souther Hillman Furay Band. During this time Al Perkins, the band's pedal steel guitar player, introduced Furay to Christianity. His newfound faith helped him rebuild his troubled marriage.

Although Souther Hillman Furay Band's self-titled first album was certified Gold and yielded the top thirty hit with "Fallin' in Love" in 1974, the group could not follow up on that success, and poor record sales eventually led to its demise.

After moving from Los Angeles to Sugarloaf Mountain near Boulder, Colorado, Furay formed The Richie Furay Band with Jay Truax, John Mehler, and Tom Stipe, releasing the album I've Got a Reason in 1976, which reflected Furay's newfound beliefs. To support the release of this album, Furay formed an alliance with David Geffen and Asylum Records. Furay assured Geffen that his album would be Christian influenced but would not be an attempt to preach his newfound beliefs. I've Got a Reason did, however, establish Furay as a pioneer in Christian Rock.

Overall, his albums charted unsatisfactorily, and, compounded with the strain of touring wearing on him and his family, he retired as a performer to join the ministry. In 1983, Furay became senior pastor of the Calvary Chapel in Broomfield, Colorado, a non-sectarian Christian church in the Denver area.

In 1989, Fury reunited with Poco to release an album entitled Legacy.

Later career 
In 2006 he released his album The Heartbeat of Love, and also toured as an opening act for America and Linda Ronstadt. In 2007, he toured with a new formation of the Richie Furay Band. At the Boulder and Bluebird Theatres in Colorado, they recorded a double live album ALIVE. The ALIVE set covers 29 songs of Furay's career. The Richie Furay band continued to tour through 2008 and 2009.

Furay appeared with Poco for several shows in early 2009. At the Stagecoach Festival in Indio, California in 2009, Furay and the current Poco lineup were joined onstage by original members Jim Messina and George Grantham and former bass player Timothy B. Schmit.

On October 23, 2010, he reunited with surviving Buffalo Springfield bandmates Stephen Stills and Neil Young for a set at the 24th annual Bridge School Benefit at Shoreline Amphitheater in Mountain View, California. The reunion continued in 2011 for a one-month tour of California, headlining 2011 Bonnaroo. In July 2011, Furay announced on his Facebook page that he would be touring with Buffalo Springfield in early 2012, ending speculation there would be a 2011 fall tour with them.

In 2011, Furay collaborated with the Piedmont Brothers Band as an occasional back-up vocalist on the album PBB III (2011). He later appear on the 2013 Carla Olson album, Have Harmony, Will Travel.

In 2015, he released the new album Hand in Hand to positive critical reviews.

Furay retired as Pastor of Calvary Chapel in December 2017.

On June 13, 2018, the Richie Furay Band began the Deliverin' Tour at the South Orange Performing Arts Center (SOPAC) in New Jersey. The first set consisted of Buffalo Springfield, Poco, Souther, Hillman & Furay Band and solo material, followed by a second set in which the classic 1971 Poco live album "DeLIVErin'" was performed in its entirety. A single, “I Guess You Made It”, was released on Furay's website (richiefuray.com).

The tour continued throughout the year, culminating with a Poco 50th Anniversary Celebration on November 16, 2018 at the Troubadour in Los Angeles, where Poco first performed in 1969. Randy Meisner and Peter Asher were in the audience (Poco bandmate and longtime friend, Timothy B. Schmit performed with Furay.) Furay's Troubadour show was recorded and, in April, 2021, was released in both CD and DVD as DeLIVErin' Again (50th Anniversary: Return to the Troubadour). That same year, Furay released the single, "America, America" through his website.

Recent years 
In mid-2019, Furay announced he would be retiring from headline touring. He embarked on a tour of the west coast in the fall of 2019, sharing the bill with Dave Mason. Furay's “Farewell/76th Birthday Celebration” was originally scheduled to take place at the South Orange Performing Arts Center (SOPAC) in New Jersey in 2020, however due to the COVID-19 pandemic and storm damage to the SOPAC building, the show was postponed until 2022, so he performed a "Farewell Show" at Drew University in Madison NJ on November 14, 2021 (the date of the originally scheduled SOPAC show.)  He has scheduled a few one-off shows in Colorado and California in the spring of 2022, with the SOPAC "Farewell Show" rescheduled for June 2022 at SOPAC, under the direction of his manager, David Stone. He has included "Crazy Love" and "Bad Weather" in his shows, as a tribute to Poco bandmates Rusty Young and Paul Cotton, respectively, who both died in 2021. 

In June and July 2022, Furay kicked off a mini-tour, beginning in New Jersey, as well as the City Winery's in Nashville, New York City, Washington DC, Philadelphia, and Boston. The shows, being billed as Furay's farewell tour, are in support of his new album In the Country which includes cover versions of Furay's favorite country songs. In the Country features a cover of Keith Urban's "Someone Like You", released as a single. The recording also contains songs by John Denver, Garth Brooks, George Strait, Marc Cohn, and Ricky Nelson, as well as a remake of the Poco song "Pickin' Up the Pieces". 

A documentary, Through It All: The Life and Influence of Richie Furay is currently in post-production. It is narrated by Cameron Crowe.

Discography

Solo 
Studio albums
I've Got a Reason (1976) (Asylum) (US Billboard # 130)
Dance a Little Light (1978) (Asylum)
I Still Have Dreams (1979) (Asylum)
Seasons of Change (1982) (Myrrh Records)
In My Father's House (1997) (Calvary Chapel Records)
I Am Sure (2005) (FridayMusic)
The Heartbeat of Love (2006) (Richie Furay and John Macy)
Hand in Hand (2015) (Entertainment One)
In the Country (2022)
Live albums
ALIVE (2007) (FridayMusic)
 DeLIVErin' Again (Return to the Troubadour: 50th Anniversary) (2021) (DSDK Productions)
Compilation albums
Songs of Richie Furay (1980) (Epic Records)
Singles
Richie Furay: "This Magic Moment" / "Bittersweet Love" (1978) (Asylum) (US Billboard #101)
Richie Furay: "I Still Have Dreams" / "Headin' South" (1979) (Asylum) (US Billboard #39)

Band projects 
As a member of the Au Go-Go Singers:
Au Go-Go Singers (with Stephen Stills) (1964) (Roulette Records)

As a member of Buffalo Springfield:
Buffalo Springfield (1966) (Atco)
Buffalo Springfield Again (1967) (Atco)
Last Time Around (1968) (Atco)

As a member of Poco:
Pickin' Up the Pieces (1969) (Epic)
Poco (1970) (Epic)
Deliverin' (1971) (Epic)
From the Inside (1971) (Epic)
A Good Feelin' to Know (1972) (Epic)
Crazy Eyes (1973) (Epic)
Legacy (1989) (RCA)
As a member of Souther–Hillman–Furay Band
The Souther–Hillman–Furay Band (1974) (Asylum)
Trouble in Paradise (1975) (Asylum)

References

External links

 
Interview with Richie Furay (part 1 and part 2) on KDRT-LP 95.7 FM (Davis, Calif.) August 2015

1944 births
Living people
American country singer-songwriters
American country rock singers
American rock singers
American tenors
Buffalo Springfield members
Poco members
Souther–Hillman–Furay Band members
American Christian clergy
Rhythm guitarists
Epic Records artists
Myrrh Records artists
American country guitarists
American rock guitarists
American male singer-songwriters
American male guitarists
Lead guitarists
20th-century American guitarists
Guitarists from Ohio
Singer-songwriters from Ohio